Fontana Liri is a comune (municipality) in the Province of Frosinone in the Italian region Lazio, located about  southeast of Rome and about  east of Frosinone. Fontana Liri is in the Latin Valley.

Fontana Liri borders the following municipalities: Arce, Arpino, Monte San Giovanni Campano, Rocca d'Arce, Santopadre.

The town is the birthplace of Marcello Mastroianni and Umberto Mastroianni.

Dialect 
Southern Latian dialect is spoken in the city.

References

External links
 Official website

Cities and towns in Lazio